Charles Clague (1890–1962) was a British-born art director who worked in Hollywood films. He was employed by Columbia Pictures during the 1940s and early 1950s.

Selected filmography
 Phantom of Chinatown (1940)
 Farewell to Fame (1941)
 Terror Trail (1946)
 The Lone Wolf in Mexico (1947)
 Sport of Kings (1947)
 Moonlight Raid (1949)
 Harmony Inn (1949)
 Trail of the Rustlers (1950)
 Mule Train (1950)
 The Hills of Utah (1951)
 Ridin' the Outlaw Trail (1951)
 The Kid from Amarillo (1951)
 Laramie Mountains (1952)
 Cripple Creek (1952)
 Junction City (1952)
 The Old West (1952)

References

Bibliography
 Blottner, Gene. Columbia Pictures Movie Series, 1926-1955: The Harry Cohn Years. McFarland, 2011.

External links

1890 births
1962 deaths
Manx people
British art directors
British emigrants to the United States